Your Money or Your Life (French: La bourse et la vie) is a 1966 comedy film directed by Jean-Pierre Mocky and starring Fernandel,  Heinz Rühmann and Jean Poiret. It was made as a co-production between France, Italy and West Germany. It is a loose remake of the 1931 German film The Virtuous Sinner in which Rühmann had also appeared.

It was shot at the Billancourt Studios in Paris and the Bavaria Studios in Munich. Location shooting also took place across France including Toulouse.

Partial cast
 Fernandel as Charles Migue  
 Heinz Rühmann as Henry Schmidt  
 Jean Poiret as Lucien Pélépan  
 Marilù Tolo as Violette 
 Jean Carmet as Le curé  
 André Gabriello as Pierre Robinhoude  
 Jacques Legras as Tapu  
 Claude Piéplu as Un surveillant de l'agence de Paris  
 Darry Cowl as Marquy 
 Michel Galabru as Maître Laprise  
 Simone Duhart as Madame le P.-d.g.  
 Andrex as Le chef de convoi  
 Krista Nell as Geneviève  
 Roger Legris as Dumoulin, le pharmacien  
 Colette Teissèdre as Ursula  
 Henri Poirier as Un parieur  
 Claude Mansard as Un parieur  
 Marcel Pérès as Le gardien de l'agence de Toulouse  
 Raymond Jourdan as Un parieur  
 Maryse Martin as La femme à la valise  
 Michael Lonsdale as Le conférencier au club des timides 
 Pierre Gualdi as Jean Ronbinhoude  
 Rudy Lenoir as Un surveillant de l'agence de Paris  
 Jean-Claude Rémoleux as Paul Robinhoude / Un chauffeur de camion  
 Léonce Corne as Un employé de la SNCF  
 Françoise Arnaud as Une timide  
 Gilbert Robin as Un voyageur  
 Dominique Zardi as Un convoyeur  
 Henri Attal as Le voyageur au chat

References

Bibliography 
 James Monaco. The Encyclopedia of Film. Perigee Books, 1991.

External links 
 

1966 films
1960s crime comedy films
German crime comedy films
West German films
1960s French-language films
Films directed by Jean-Pierre Mocky
Italian crime comedy films
French crime comedy films
Bavaria Film films
Films shot at Billancourt Studios
Films with screenplays by Marcel Aymé
1966 comedy films
1960s French films
1960s Italian films
1960s German films